Knavs is a Slovenian surname. Notable people with the surname include:

Aleksander Knavs (born 1975), Slovenian footballer
Melania Trump (born Melanija Knavs in 1970), Slovene-American former model and First Lady of the United States

Slovene-language surnames